The Gran Hotel is a hotel in San José, Costa Rica. It was built in 1930 and is a historic monument in the city. Its address is Central and Second Avenue between First and Third Streets. It's located next to the National Theater  and the Plaza de la Cultura, under which lies the Pre-Columbian Gold Museum. There is a casino in the lobby and a cafe on the patio, which is noted for its marimba performances.

Name Change
On October 5, 2011, Tribune Business News announced that the Gran Hotel in Costa Rica became a member of the Choice International and Reals Hotels & Resorts chain, which resulted in renaming the hotel.  The  name was changed to the Gran Hotel Costa Rica Ascend Collection and announced on December 14 through a press release.

On Sep 10, 2018, it became part of the Hilton Curio Collection.

Hotel Features	
Guest Rooms

The Gran Hotel offers five different room packages. These include standard room, superior room, deluxe room,
master suite and the J.F.K. presidential suite. All rooms except standard rooms are equipped with air conditioners. There are also rooms for disabled guests. Before remodeling in 2018, there were 107 guest rooms. Now there are 79 guest rooms, suites and executive rooms.

References

External links
Official site

Hotels in Costa Rica
Buildings and structures in San José, Costa Rica
Hotel buildings completed in 1899
1899 establishments in Costa Rica